Oscar Jaryee Quiah was a Liberian politician.

Quiah hailed from a Sarpo family in Sinoe County. Quiah was a founding member of the Progressive Alliance of Liberia (PAL). Quiah was among the arrested in the April 14, 1979 rice riots. He was detained at the Monrovia Central Prison and was charged with treason. He was one of the founders of the Progressive People's Party (PPP) and served as its secretary general, and remained with party as it was converted into the United People's Party (UPP). Quiah was named Minister of Local Government, Urban Reconstruction and Rural Development in the government of the People's Redemption Council of Samuel K. Doe 1980-1981. In 1981 Quiah was accused of participating in a plot led by Major-General Thomas Weh Syen against Doe. He was removed from his ministerial post and arrested.

He later split from UPP and joined Doe's National Democratic Party of Liberia (NDPL). He served as the secretary general of the NDPL. Quiah served as director-general of the Civil Service Authority 1985-1986. Quiah headed the National Housing Authority. He served as Minister of Post and Telecommunications, before being removed from the post by President Doe in 1987.

Quiah became a member of the Council of State (the collective presidency of the Liberian National Transitional Government) installed on September 1, 1995. He represented the Liberian National Conference, a coalition of civil society organizations, in the Council of State. At the time he was considered close to the 'Coalition Forces'. During the April-May 1996 clashes in Monrovia, Quiah suffered a stroke and was evacuted to Accra for treatment. When the Council of State was restructured later in 1996 under the chairmanship of Ruth Perry, Quiah retained his seat on the Council.

Quiah died at ELWA Hospital on January 30, 2021. He had been ill for months. President George Weah sent condoleances to Quiah's family following the announcement of his death.

References

2021 deaths
Members of the Council of State
People from Sinoe County
National Democratic Party of Liberia politicians
United People's Party (Liberia) politicians
Progressive Alliance of Liberia politicians
Government ministers of Liberia